Westvleteren is a brewery founded in 1838 at the Trappist Abbey of Saint Sixtus in Vleteren, Belgium.

The brewery's three beers have acquired an international reputation for taste and quality; Westvleteren 12 is considered by some to be the best beer in the world. The beers are not brewed to normal commercial demands but are sold in small quantities weekly from the doors of the monastery itself to individual buyers on an advance-order basis.

History 
Trappist monks from the Mont des Cats monastery in France founded the St. Sixtus monastery in 1831. In 1838, the brewing began at Westvleteren. In 1850, some of the monks founded the Notre-Dame de Scourmont monastery, which also brews a Trappist beer called Chimay. During World Wars I and II, the Westvleteren brewery continued to operate, albeit at reduced capacity. It was the sole Trappist brewery to retain the copper vessels throughout the 1914–18 and 1939-45 wars — the other breweries having had their copper requisitioned by the German occupation forces. In World War I this was primarily due to the abbey not being occupied by the Germans; it was caring for wounded allied troops. In 1931, the abbey began selling beer to the general public, having only served beer to guests and visitors up until that time. In 1946, the St. Bernardus brewery in nearby Watou was granted a licence to brew beer under the St. Sixtus name. This agreement ended in 1992; St. Bernardus still brews beers of similar styles, but under their own name. That same year, the abbey opened its new brewery to replace the older equipment.

The brewery currently employs three secular workers for various manual labour tasks; however, the primary brewing is done by the monks only. Of the 26 Trappists who reside at the abbey, five monks run the brewery, with an additional five who assist during bottling.

Commercial orientations 
As with all other Trappist breweries, the beer is only sold in order to financially support the monastery and other philanthropic causes. Whilst the brewery is a business by definition (its purpose is to make money), it does not exist for pure profit motives, and they do no advertising. The monks have repeatedly stated that they only brew enough beer to run the monastery, and will make no more than they need to sell, regardless of demand. During World War II, the brewery stopped supplying wholesalers and since then they only sell to individual buyers in person at the brewery or the visitors' centre opposite. These methods all go against modern business methods; however, as stated by the Father Abbott on the opening of the new brewery, "We are not brewers. We are monks. We brew beer to be able to afford being monks."

Beers 

The brewery brews three beers:
 Westvleteren Blonde (green cap), 5.8% ABV, introduced on 10 June 1999.
 Westvleteren 8 (blue cap) (formerly Extra), 8% ABV.
 Westvleteren 12 (yellow cap) (formerly Abt), a 10.2% ABV, introduced in 1940.

Until 1999, the brewery also produced a 6.2% ABV dark beer and a lighter 4° which served as the monks' table beer, but these were replaced by the Blonde. The 8 and 12 are bottle conditioned and are considered to have a long shelf life, with some drinkers preferring the taste when the beers have been stored for several years. The ingredients are yeast, hops, malt, sugar, caramel and water.

The bottles have been sold without labels since 1945. All of the legally required information is printed on the crown tops. Because of this lack of space, Westvleteren beers are the only Trappist beers that do not have the official Trappist logo displayed on the bottle. The logo is only printed on the distinctive wooden crates. Any bottles that are labelled have had them added unofficially by others. For example, some importers into the United States label the bottles in order to comply with local regulations.

Availability 
Buyers were originally limited to ten 24-bottle crates of the beer per car, but as the beer increased in popularity, this was first reduced to five, then to three and now to two or one crates. For the Westvleteren 12 in 2009, it was limited to one case. When making an order now, the type and quantity of beer available for sale are revealed. Sales are limited to one order every 60 days per person per license plate and phone number. Also, the beer must be reserved online through the abbey's website, with registration weeks or even months before the planned pick up date. The online system has replaced the "beerphone" in 2019. The monks do not sell beer to individuals who drive up to the abbey hoping to purchase beer. The reason for this is to eliminate commercial reselling, and hence give all visitors a chance to purchase the product.

The current production is 475 kilolitres (60,000 cases) per year, and has remained the same since 1946.

Aside from the brewery itself, the only other official sale point for the beer is the abbey-owned In de Vrede, a cafe and visitor's centre opposite the abbey. All beers can be bought there for immediate consumption or take-away, depending on availability (however, prices are higher than at the abbey). Often there is no beer available at the shop. The shop also sells cheeses made at the abbey, yeast tabs (not yeast to make beer but dead yeast for health) and other Trappist products.

Buyers of the beer receive a receipt with Niet verder verkopen ("Do not resell") printed on it. The abbey is very much against resale of their beer, and it is their wish that the beer is only commercially available at the two abbey-owned official sale points. Therefore, any Westvleteren beer offered for sale anywhere else in the world is a grey- or black market item, as there are no wholesalers in existence that supply the beer. The abbey is actively working to eliminate the illicit sales, and generally only agrees to media interviews to spread their message against drinking illicitly sold Westvleteren beer.

The brewery and the Belgian retailer Colruyt put a gift pack (6 bottles of Westvleteren 12, plus 2 glasses) on sale, available only on exchange of promotional coupons printed in selected media. The goal of the sales was to increase income to provide funds for urgent and immediate renovations at the monastery. Available from November 2, 2011, sales were limited to 93,000 packs, at 25 Euro per pack. All earnings of the sale were to be put towards the renovation project. This was the first time the brewery had done something like this.

On November 4, 2011, it was announced that 7760 gift packs (each containing 6 bottles of Westvleteren 12 and 2 glasses) would be imported by US-based Shelton Brothers, starting in April 2012. During a Shelton Brothers beer festival in June 2012, the gift packs were then made available to attendees at the price of $85. The original arrangement also listed Manneken-Brussels Imports Austin, Texas, as an additional distributor for the western states, but the Manneken-Brussels deal fell through in May 2012.

On December 12, 2012, gift packs were briefly made available in the US. As with the previous release, the gift packs contained 6 bottles of Westvleteren 12 and 2 decorated glasses. Distributed to selected locations across 22 states, they retailed at the regulated price of $84.99.

A six pack (at CAD$76.85) was sold out on December 12, 2012, at various LCBO locations in Ontario.

International reputation 
Many beer drinkers rank Westvleteren 12 among their favourite beers. The 8 and the Blonde also rank highly on beer-rating websites.

In June 2005, when Westvleteren 12 was again highlighted as "Best Beer in the World", news organizations followed this up and articles appeared in the international press, highlighting the beer ranking and the unusual business policies. In 2014 it was rated best beer in the world by Ratebeer.com.

Following these events, interest in Westvleteren's output increased and stories appeared of the abbey's stock being low, forcing the monks to reduce the amount of beer sold to each customer. In an interview, monk Mark Bode explained that the abbey had no intention of increasing its production, despite demand: "We make the beer to live but we do not live for beer."

Despite the popularity, the monks of St Sixtus have continued to decline almost all interview and visit requests, and have not enjoyed all of the attention they have received. Non-monastic visitors to the abbey are usually turned away, instead being directed to the visitor's centre opposite where there is information about the abbey and brewery. They have stated their desire to only produce as much beer as needed to finance the community.

References

External links 

Abbey of Saint Sixtus official website
Abbey of Saint Sixtus official webshop
Sint Sixtus Abbey of Westvleteren, brewery details from BeerTourism.com

1838 establishments in Belgium
Belgian brands
Trappist breweries in Belgium
Breweries of Flanders
Companies based in West Flanders